Gimhae is a city in South Gyeongsang Province, South Korea. It is the seat of the large Gimhae Kim clan, one of the largest Kim clans in Korea. The Gimhae Kims claim descent from the ancient royal house of Geumgwan Gaya, which was based in Gimhae. Gimhae is situated near the Nakdong River.

The city has a K3 League soccer club called Gimhae FC. The largest foreign sports club in Gimhae is the Gimhae Semi-Athletic Club (G-SAC) located in Nae-dong.

Gimhae is also the birthplace of the late Roh Moo-hyun, former president of South Korea.

Administrative divisions
Jinyeong-eup (13 ri)
Daedong-myeon (10 ri)
Hallim-myeon (12 ri)
Jillye-myeon (10 ri)
Juchon-myeon (8 ri)
Saengnim-myeon (8 ri)
Sangdong-myeon (6 ri)
Bukbu-dong (3 legal dong)
Buram-dong (2 legal dong)
Buwon-dong
Chilsanseobu-dong (7 legal dong)
Dongsang-dong
Hoehyeon-dong (2 legal dong)
Hwalcheon-dong (2 legal dong)
Jangyu-dong (3 legal dong)
Naeoe-dong (2 legal dong)
Saman-dong (2 legal dong)

Climate
Gimhae has a humid subtropical climate (Köppen: Cwa) with very warm summers and cold winters. Due to the influence of its coastal climate, Gimhae is the mildest region in Korea. The annual average temperature is around 15℃, and annual average precipitation is 1,200 mm, which is very close to the Korean average of 1,274 mm.

Transportation

Airport
Gimhae International Airport is just east of Gimhae (in Gangseo-gu, Busan) and has 9.17 million annual users. Various conveniences, especially those for the disabled, will be expanded step by step.

Railways
Gimhae has two stations on the Gyeongjeon Line; Hallimjeong station (한림정역) and Jinyeong station (진영역). The Busan–Gimhae Light Rail Transit, which opened in September 2011, connects the city to Busan via the airport. The closest KTX station from Gimhae is Gupo station in Busan.

Floricultural industry
Gimhae has spacious flower gardens. Busan and its neighbor cities have exported large amounts of flowers.

Gimhae farming center exploited to develop independent Korean roses called Spray.

Twin towns – sister cities

Gimhae is twinned with:

 Ayodhya, India
 Biên Hòa, Vietnam
 Çorum, Turkey
 Munakata, Japan
 Salem, United States
 Wuxi, China

Lakewood, WA, United States

Notable former residents
Roh Moo-hyun, (August 6, 1946 – May 23, 2009), South Korean politician and 16th President of South Korea (2003–2008)
Yoon Sung-hyo (born 1962), South Korean football manager and former football player
Song Kang-ho (born 1967), South Korean actor (Snowpiercer, Drug King and Parasite)
Lee Jung-soo (born 1980), South Korean footballer (central defender)
Lee Min-ki (born 1985), South Korean actor, singer and model
Yeo Min-ji (born 1993), South Korean women's footballer (Suwon UDC WFC, WK League)
Yang Sang-guk (born 1983), South Korean comedian
Mia (Real Name: Han Eun-ji, Hangul: 한은지, born 2000), singer, dancer and K-pop idol, member of K-pop girlgroup Everglow

See also
Administrative divisions of South Korea
Geography of South Korea
List of cities in South Korea
Gimhae International Airport

References

External links

City government website

 

 
Cities in South Gyeongsang Province